Radiation Research, the official journal of the Radiation Research Society, is a monthly peer-reviewed scientific journal covering research into the  areas of biology, chemistry, medicine and physics, including epidemiology and translational research at academic institutions, private research institutes, research hospitals and government agencies. The editorial content of Radiation Research is devoted to every aspect of scientific research into radiation. The goal of the Journal is to provide researchers with the latest information in all areas of radiation science. 

The current editor-in-chief is Marc Mendonca (Indiana University School of Medicine). According to the Journal Citation Reports, the journal has an impact factor of 2.539 and a 5-year impact factor of 2.775.

This journal had a supplement titled Radiation Research Supplement which appeared in 8 volumes between 1959 and 1985.

Past Editors-in-Chief
Titus C. Evans, Vol. 1–50Oddvar F. Nygaard, Vol. 51–79Daniel Billen, Vol. 80–113R. J. Michael Fry, Vol. 114–147John F. Ward, Vol. 148–154Sara Rockwell, Vol. 155–174

References

External links

Website of the Radiation Research Society
 Current issue of Radiation Research can be found at: http://www.bioone.org/toc/rare/current

Publications established in 1954
Monthly journals
Academic journals published by learned and professional societies
English-language journals